Batrachognathus is an extinct genus of anurognathid pterosaur from the Late Jurassic (Oxfordian to Kimmeridgian) Karabastau Formation of the central Asian republic of Kazakhstan. The genus was named in 1948 by the Russian paleontologist Anatoly Nicolaevich Ryabinin. The type species is Batrachognathus volans. The genus name is derived from Greek batrakhos, "frog" and gnathos, "jaw", in reference to the short wide head. The specific epithet means "flying" in Latin.

Description

Like all anurognathids Batrachognathus is assumed to have been an insectivore, catching insects and perhaps small fish on the wing with its broad mouth.

Three fossils have been found in a lacustrine sediment in the North-West Tien Shan foothills of the Karatau Mountains. In the Jurassic this area had some similarities in habitat to the Solnhofen lagoon deposits in Bavaria, Germany. The genus is based on holotype PIN 52-2, an incomplete and disarticulated skeleton consisting of skull fragments, jaws, vertebrae, ribs, legs and wing bones. The skull of 48 mm (1.9 in) long is high, short and broad. The upper jaws have in total 22 or 24 recurved conical teeth; with the lower jaws they make a short and very wide mouth. The animal is not preserved with a tail. Whether it had one is debatable; usually it is assumed a short tail was present.

Classification
Batrachognathus was assigned to the Anurognathidae, as a relative of Anurognathus. In 2003 Alexander Kellner named the clade Asiaticognathidae to include it and the Asian Anurognathid Dendrorhynchoides. Christopher Bennett pointed out the name Asiaticognathidae was inappropriate, as the clade lacked an Asiaticognathus, and in 2009 Kellner proposed Batrachognathinae as a replacement. According to an analysis in 2006 by Lü Junchang, Batrachognathus and Jeholopterus are sister taxa. In 2021, a phylogenetic analysis conducted by Xuefang Wei and colleagues recovered Batrachognathus within the subfamily Batrachognathinae, sister taxon to the genus Sinomacrops. Below is a cladogram representing their phylogenetic analysis:

See also
 List of pterosaur genera
 Timeline of pterosaur research

References
 Dinosaurs and other Prehistoric Creatures, edited by Ingrid Cranfield, 2000 Salamander Books Ltd pg 280-281.

Late Jurassic pterosaurs of Asia
Monofenestratans
Fossil taxa described in 1948